Dean McCullough (born July 1992) is a Northern Irish radio DJ and TV presenter. He currently presents at BBC Radio 1 and has previously presented on Gaydio.

Early life 
McCullough was born in 1992. He is from Newtownabbey, Northern Ireland. McCullough realised he was gay at the age of 11 or 12. He attended Glengormley High School and obtained a scholarship from Laine Theatre Arts.

Career 
McCullough began presenting on the radio as a volunteer for Wandsworth Radio. In May 2018, McCullough began presenting in the afternoon with Emma Goswell on Gaydio. Their show covered current LGBTQ+ issues. In December 2020, McCullough filled in for Clara Amfo on BBC Radio 1 for two days. He returned in March 2021 to cover the early breakfast show on Fridays for five weeks. In September 2021, he began hosting the 10:30 to 13:00 slot on Radio 1, Fridays to Sundays, replacing Jordan North - who went on to host the station's weekday (except Fridays) drivetime show alongside Vick Hope. His show is broadcast from MediaCityUK in Salford.

In July 2022, it was announced that Dean would replace Scott Mills as co-host of Radio 1's weekday afternoon show, from 1pm until 3.30 pm, alongside Vicky Hawkesworth.

References

External links
Dean and Vicky (BBC Radio 1)

BBC Radio 1 presenters
Radio DJs from Northern Ireland
Living people
1992 births
LGBT entertainers from Northern Ireland